Centro de Eventos do Ceará (English: Ceará Event Center) is a multi-purpose indoor arena in Fortaleza, Brazil. It is the second largest convention center in Latin America in a total area of 76,000 m2.

The arena had its first event on June 30, 2012, with a show by Jennifer Lopez and Ivete Sangalo as a part of Arte Music Festival. However, the arena was officially inaugurated on August 15, 2012, with a show by Spanish tenor Plácido Domingo and Orquestra de Câmara Eleazar de Carvalho.

Structure
The arena is divided into two large blocks, composed by two exhibition halls and two mezzanines, with eighteen rooms each. The exhibition halls have an area of 13,500 m2, with a capacity of 30,000 spectators and are divided into West Pavilion and East Pavilion.

Events
The following is a list of notable events held at Centro de Eventos do Ceará.
Centro de Eventos do Ceará Grand Opening  – August 15, 2012
Miss Brasil 2012 – September 29, 2012
6th BRICS summit – July 14-15, 2014
Miss Brasil 2014 – July 19, 2014
Super Amostra Nacional de Animes - Held two times a year, the event popularly known as "SANA", is focused on anime, manga, tokusatsu, videogame also card game like Yu-Gi-Oh!, geek culture, J-pop and K-pop concerts.
Intersolar Summit Brazil Nordeste - April 10, 11, 2019

Concerts

References

External links
Official website

Indoor arenas in Brazil
Convention centres in Brazil
Buildings and structures in Fortaleza